Alfreð Elíasson (1920 - 1988) was an Icelandic businessman who founded and served as president of Loftleidir.

Loftleiðir Icelandic Airlines was formed in 1944 with a single engine, three passenger plane of Stinson Reliant make, Loftleiðir grew to become one of the major carriers of the North Atlantic in the 1960s and early 1970s pioneering low-cost air travel over the Atlantic.

He has had his story made into a documentary film called Alfred Eliasson & Loftleiðir Icelandic made in 2009 in Iceland, which tells the story of the airline and Alfred, narrated in Icelandic by Arnar Jónsson.

References

Footnotes

Citations

Alfred Eliasson
1920 births
1988 deaths
Airline founders
Alfred Eliasson